The Jeep Renegade is a subcompact crossover SUV produced by Stellantis under their Jeep marque. It was first shown to the public in March 2014 at the Geneva Motor Show and production started in late August of that year. , the Renegade is the smallest vehicle that is currently marketed by Jeep, slotting below the Compass. It is based on the FCA Small Wide 4×4 platform which is also shared with other FCA models, including from Fiat and Alfa Romeo brands.

The Renegade came standard with front-wheel drive, with optional four-wheel drive systems Active Drive I and Active Drive Low, both of which are paired with Jeep's Selec-Terrain System.

Overview

At one time it was believed that the Renegade would replace the Jeep Compass and Jeep Patriot in the Jeep lineup. The Patriot was discontinued after model year 2017, but the second generation Compass was launched in early 2017.

The Renegade is the first Jeep product to be produced exclusively outside of North America and is sold in the North American, European, Brazilian, South African, Australian, Japanese and Chinese markets. The vehicle is built in Melfi, Italy with the designation BU/520, alongside the related Fiat 500X; Goiana, Brazil with the designation B1 (alongside Jeep Compass and Fiat Toro); and in Guangzhou, China codenamed BQ.

Standard Renegade models come with front-wheel drive, with four-wheel drive available on Sport,  Latitude and Limited  trims. In the US, the lineup consists of Sport, Latitude and Limited trims, all of which come with a choice of front- and four-wheel drive, as well as the Trailhawk trim, which is 4WD only.

The Renegade has an available My Sky dual panel removable roof. The My Sky can be either retracted like a standard sunroof or removed completely for a more open-air experience, similar to that of the Jeep Wrangler.

Trim levels
In North America, the Renegade is sold in Sport, Latitude, Altitude, Limited and Trailhawk trim levels:

Sport
The base Sport model includes a 1.4L MultiAir Turbocharged Inline Four-Cylinder (I4) engine or a 2.4L multiair inline 4 engine, a six-speed manual transmission or 9 speed automatic transmission, sixteen-inch, black-finished steel wheels, a black-finished front grille, black side mirrors and door handles, the Uconnect 3.0 AM/FM stereo w/ USB, iPod, and 3.5-millimeter auxiliary audio input jacks and four speakers, a heater, dual air conditioning, cloth seating surfaces, a 3.5-inch monochromatic instrument cluster display screen, remote keyless entry with power door locks, and more. The Power and Air Group adds air conditioning and power windows. The Sound Group adds the Uconnect 5.0BT AM/FM stereo with USB, iPod, and 3.5-millimeter auxiliary audio input jacks with five-inch color touch-screen display, voice command, Uconnect hands-free Bluetooth phone and stereo wireless audio streaming, and six speakers.

Latitude
The mid-level Latitude model includes the Sport's standard equipment, plus seventeen-inch black-accented alloy wheels, exterior-colored side mirrors and door handles, the Uconnect 5.0BT AM/FM stereo w/ USB, iPod, and 3.5-millimeter auxiliary audio input jacks with five-inch color touch-screen display, voice command, Uconnect hands-free Bluetooth phone and stereo wireless audio streaming and six speakers, power windows, air conditioning, and more. The MySky removable "sunroof" roof panels, both manually-removable or power-retractable, are available on this model and higher-end models. In Europe, this is called Longitude.

Limited
The top-of-the-line Limited model includes the Latitude's standard equipment, plus the 2.4L TigerShark Inline Four-Cylinder (I4) engine, a nine-speed automatic transmission, leather seating surfaces, a silver-finished front grille, chrome side mirrors and door handles, and more. The MySky removable "sunroof" panels, both manually-removable or power-retractable, are available on this model, the Latitude model, and higher-end models.

Trailhawk
The off road-ready Trailhawk model includes the Latitude's standard equipment, plus the 2.4L TigerShark Inline Four-Cylinder (I4) engine (2.0L Multijet II only for Europe), a nine-speed automatic transmission, red-finished front tow hooks, off-road suspension with underbody skid plates, a rugged interior, and more. The MySky removable "sunroof" panels, both manually-removable or power-retractable, are available on this model, the Latitude model, and higher-end models.

TrailHawk models are "Trail Rated" and feature Jeep's Active Drive Low four-wheel drive system and a  lift kit. It also features  aluminum wheels, skid plates, and unique front and rear fascias compared to standard Renegade models. Like the Jeep Cherokee Trailhawk, the Renegade Trailhawk features red front and rear tow hooks, a red 'Trail Rated 4X4' badge on both front upper fenders, a black vinyl decal in the center of the hood, and alloy wheels with black-painted accents. The Trailhawk model emphasizes the Renegade's off-road capabilities, and is meant for the avid off-roader.

The Jeep Selec-terrain traction control feature lets you choose any of the following modes in the 4X4 TrailHawk version: Auto, Snow, Sand, Mud or Rock.

Optional features
All models other than the base Sport model offer optional features such as passive entry with push-button start, a remote start system, the Uconnect 6.5AN stereo with AM/FM HD Radio, iPod/USB and 3.5-millimeter auxiliary audio input jacks, SIRIUS-XM Satellite Radio, voice command, Uconnect ACCESS and Apps with hands-free Bluetooth phone and stereo wireless audio streaming, GPS navigation by Garmin, a 6.5-inch touch-screen display, and steering wheel-mounted remote controls, nine premium amplified speakers with a subwoofer, power front bucket seats, the MySky retractable roof panel system (manually-removable or power-retractable), heated dual front bucket seats, and more.

Powertrain
All Renegade models are powered by 3 or 4-cylinder engines, sourced both from Fiat and Chrysler depending on market.

Interior features

The Renegade offers either cloth or leather seating surfaces. It offers seating for four passengers, with a 50/50 split-folding rear bench seat, and a fold-flat front passenger's seat for more cargo capacity.

In North America, it offers a standard Uconnect 5.0BT radio with an AM/FM radio, Sirius XM satellite radio, voice command, a Microsoft-derived touch screen interface, and iPod and USB inputs, as well as a 3.5-millimeter auxiliary audio input jack. Uconnect Phone will also be standard. A rearview backup camera will be optional. The optional radio will be the UConnect 6.0 radio, offering all the features of the UConnect 5.0BT radio, while adding a touch screen interface designed by BlackBerry (a smaller version of the UConnect 8.4A and 8.4AN radios), and navigation system capabilities by Garmin.

Safety

Latin NCAP
The Renegade was safety tested by Latin NCAP in 2015 and earned a five-star rating.

Euro NCAP

2014
The Renegade was safety tested by Euro NCAP in 2014 and earned a five-star rating.

2019
The Renegade in its standard European configuration received 3 stars from Euro NCAP in 2019.

IIHS
The Renegade was safety tested by the IIHS in 2020.

NHTSA

Facelift

2019 model year

In June 2018, the Renegade was updated with some slight aesthetic touches: the front and rear bumpers have been redesigned, new LED headlamps (their design is inspired by the ones used for the Wrangler) were adopted, and the front grille is larger.

The infotainment system was upgraded with a new, more up-to-date processor and a more generous display that varies from 7" up to 8.4" in the navigator version. The displays are all multitouch and the customizable menus also offering the possibility to adjust the air conditioning. Android Auto and Apple CarPlay compatibility was introduced.

The Latitude version now also has USB jack on the back of the armrest dedicated to passengers sitting in the rear seats.

The 1.0 L is available with a 5-speed manual transmission and front-wheel drive, the 1.3 L with a 6-speed manual transmission, a 6-speed automatic double clutch or a 9-speed ZF automatic with front or 4-wheel drive. The diesel engines introduced the SCR system and are approved Euro6D-Temp.

The North American model has the same changes applied to the European model.

In October 2018, the updated version for the South American market produced by FCA of Goiana (Pernambuco) in Brazil was introduced and presents only aesthetic updates with the adoption for all versions of the Trailhawk bumpers; the front and rear headlamps remain those of the previous model. The engines for the South American market are the 1.8 L E.Torq Evo gasoline and the 2.0 L Multijet diesel.

2022 changes

For 2022, all models receive a standard U Connect 4C 8.4-inch (8.4") touchscreen infotainment system, which includes SiriusXM Satellite Radio, SiriusXM Travel Link, and SiriusXM Guardian services, all with included trial subscriptions, as well as integrated GPS navigation and HD Radio. A new (RED) Edition, in partnership with Product Red, is also available. Based on the mid-level Latitude trim, the (RED) Edition adds nineteen-inch (19") tires and Granite Crystal-finished aluminum-alloy wheels, Colorado Red exterior badging, Ruby Red front and rear door speaker grille bezels and outer instrument panel bezels, Gloss Black transmission shifter and center console bezels, and Ruby Red accent stitching on the seats, steering wheel, center console lid, and transmission shifter boot. Available in Colorado Red, Alpine White, Black, and Sting-Gray, proceeds from all sales of the (RED) Edition will be donated to the Global Fund.

For the base Sport trim, the Beige interior color option has been discontinued, and the Jeep Active Safety Group now comes as standard equipment on all Renegade models. Nineteen-inch (19") tires and diamond-cut aluminum-alloy wheels are now available on the Limited trim when equipped with the optional Sun, Sound, and Wheels Package, which adds a dual-pane power panoramic moonroof and a nine-speaker Alpine premium amplified surround-sound audio system with a subwoofer.

The 2.4 L engine option was discontinued for the US market.

2023 changes

For 2023, Jeep has unveiled a refreshed model of the Renegade for the Brazilian market. Featuring revised front-end styling and a revised 1.3L "Turbo-Flex" Turbocharged Inline Four-Cylinder (I4) gasoline engine known as the "T270", the new model is also expected to debut for the rest of the world for the 2023 model year.

For 2023, in the US market, Jeep has discontinued the entry level Sport trim and all front-wheel drive versions of the Renegade, thus making all-wheel drive standard across the board. Latitude is now the entry trim level on the Renegade. Altitude, Trailhawk, and Limited remain available.

Sales

Notes

References

External links

  (US)

Renegade
Cars introduced in 2014
2020s cars
Mini sport utility vehicles
Crossover sport utility vehicles
Front-wheel-drive vehicles
All-wheel-drive vehicles
Euro NCAP small off-road
Latin NCAP small off-road
Retro-style automobiles
Cars of Brazil